Phyllonorycter malicola is a moth of the family Gracillariidae. It is known from the Russian Far East.

The larvae feed on Malus mandshurica. They probably mine the leaves of their host plant.

References

malicola
Moths of Asia
Moths described in 1979